Pinda-Boroko is a town in the far east of Ivory Coast. It is a sub-prefecture of Bondoukou Department in Gontougo Region, Zanzan District. Five kilometres east of town there is a border crossing with Ghana.

Pinda-Boroko was a commune until March 2012, when it became one of 1126 communes nationwide that were abolished.

In 2014, the population of the sub-prefecture of Pinda-Boroko was 5,012.

Villages
The six villages of the sub-prefecture of Pinda-Boroko and their population in 2014 are:

Notes

Sub-prefectures of Gontougo
Former communes of Ivory Coast